An outrunner is an electric motor having the rotor outside the stator, as though the motor were turned inside out.  They are often used in radio-controlled model aircraft.

This type of motor spins its outer shell around its windings, much like motors found in ordinary CD-ROM computer drives. In fact, CD-ROM motors are frequently rewound into brushless outrunner motors for small park flyer aircraft. Parts to aid in converting CD-ROM motors to aircraft use are commercially available.

Usually, outrunners have more poles, so they spin much slower than their inrunner counterparts with their more traditional layout (though still considerably faster than ferrite motors, when compared with motors that use neodymium magnets) while producing far more torque. This makes an outrunner an excellent choice for directly driving electric aircraft propellers since they eliminate the extra weight, complexity, inefficiency and noise of a gearbox. Some front loading direct-drive washing machines use an outrunner motor. 

Outrunner motors have quickly become popular and are now available in many sizes.  They have also become popular in personal, electric transportation applications such as electric bikes and scooters due to their compact size and high efficiency.

240 sailplanes of eleven different types from seven manufacturers are equipped with the FES propulsion system from LZ Design d.o.o of Slovenia. The 22kW provides enough power for lighter 13.5-15m gliders to self-launch and allow heavier gliders with enough power to climb and then maintain height, so avoiding an unscheduled out-landing. Its synchronous permanent magnet motor has an electronically-controlled commutation system.

Stator and magnetic pole count 
The stationary (stator) windings of an outrunner motor are excited by conventional DC brushless motor controllers. A direct current (switched on and off at high frequency for voltage modulation) is typically passed through three or more non-adjacent windings together, and the group so energized is alternated electronically based upon rotor position feedback. The number of permanent magnets in the rotor does not match the number of stator poles, however. This is to reduce cogging torque and create a sinusoidal back emf. The number of magnet poles divided by 2 gives the ratio of magnetic field frequency to motor rotation frequency.

Common stator pole/magnet pole configurations
N denotes number of stator "wire wound" poles, P denotes number of rotor "permanent magnet" poles.
 9N,12P - very common to many small outrunners. This is also the most common CD-ROM motor configuration. Winding Pattern is ABCABCABC
 9N, 6P - Common for helicopter motor, EDFs, and other high speed applications. The winding pattern is ABCABCABC
 12N, 14P (DLRK) - Common for higher torque applications. Noted commonly for its smooth and quiet operation.

Other configurations
 9N, 8P - Magnetically imbalanced motor configuration occasionally found in high speed applications. This configuration is best terminated as WYE to minimize vibration.
 9N, 10P - Highly magnetically imbalanced motor that often makes for noisy running. This configuration is usually only built by do it yourself motor builders. This motor is best terminated WYE. Winding pattern is 
 12N, 16P - A not so common but still used style. It has been overshadowed by the 12N, 14P. Winding pattern is ABCABCABCABC
 12N, 10P - Higher speed variant of the DLRK motor. Occasionally found in helicopter motors.
 12N, 8P - Even higher speed than the 12N, 10P. Winding pattern is ABCABCABCABC

See also
Inrunner

References

External links
 Brushless, outrunner-type electric motor schematics and info

Radio control
Radio-controlled aircraft
Electric motors
Electric aircraft